Sindang 5-dong is a dong, neighbourhood of Jung-gu in Seoul, South Korea.

Transportation 

See also 

Administrative divisions of South Korea

References

External links
 Jung-gu Official site in English
 Jung-gu Official site
 Jung-gu Tour Guide from the Official site
 Status quo of Jung-gu 
 Resident offices and maps of Jung-gu
 Sindang 5-dong resident office website

Neighbourhoods of Jung-gu, Seoul